The Pravčická brána is a narrow rock formation in Bohemian Switzerland in the Czech Republic, approx. 3 km northeast of Hřensko. With a span of 26.5 metres, an inside height of 16 metres, 8 metre maximum width and 3 metre arch, it is the largest natural sandstone arch in Europe, and one of the most striking nature monuments in the Elbe Sandstone Mountains. It is protected as a national nature monument.

History 
In 1826, an inn was built by the Pravčická brána. In 1881, Prince Edmund of Clary-Aldringen built the Hotel "Sokolí hnízdo" (meaning "Falcon's Nest") with 50 beds.

As a result of heavy erosion by visitors, the arch has been placed out of bounds since 1982. The entire terrain has been in private ownership since the privatisation of the hotel and may be visited for an entry fee during opening times.

The Eisenach to Budapest mountain path runs by the Pravčická brána.

Film 
Several landscape scenes in the film The Chronicles of Narnia: The Lion, the Witch and the Wardrobe were filmed here. Because the Pravčická brána may no longer be climbed on, the scenes in which the actors appear to run over the arch were taken in the studio and pasted in.

See also 
 Malá Pravčická brána

External links 

 Pravčická brána - homepages
 Pravčice gate virtual tour
 Information about the Pravčická brána in English, with a map of the area and images

Bohemian Switzerland
Rock formations of the Czech Republic
Natural arches
Děčín District